Tetiana Debela (born 28 January 1970) is a Ukrainian hurdler. She competed in the women's 400 metres hurdles at the 2000 Summer Olympics.

References

1970 births
Living people
Athletes (track and field) at the 2000 Summer Olympics
Ukrainian female hurdlers
Olympic athletes of Ukraine
Place of birth missing (living people)